Matthias Bodkin aka Matthias McDonnell Bodkin, Jesuit priest and author, 26 June 1896 – 2 November 1973.

Bodkin was a son of Matthias McDonnell Bodkin but never used his middle name, to differentiate himself from his father. He served as a Royal Navy chaplain during the Second World War, in Derry and aboard  in the Pacific.

He was a prolific writer on religious subjects, but also adventure stories for boys ( usually as M. Bodkin). In 1940, he published Halt Invader! - an account of a secret attempt to establish a ( foreign) military base in Northern Donegal, which is discovered by two visiting schoolchildren.  

His most acclaimed work was a biography of John Sullivan, a fellow Jesuit, published as The Port of Tears in 1954.

In later life, his eyesight began to fail, so he turned to retreat work and councilling. He died in Dublin.

He was a brother of Thomas Bodkin, and a descendant of the Tribes of Galway.

References
 Thomas Bodkin:a bio-bibliographical survey, with a bibliographical survey of his family, Alan Denson, 1966.
 Dictionary of Irish Biography, p. 627, Cambridge, 2010.
 Halt Invader, Browne & Nolan, Dublin, 1940. 
 http://www.ricorso.net/rx/az-data/authors/b/Bodkin_MSJ/life.htm

Christian clergy from Dublin (city)
Irish writers
1896 births
1973 deaths
20th-century Irish Jesuits
Irish military chaplains
World War II chaplains
Royal Navy chaplains